Myatlevo is a town in the Kaluga Oblast of Russia. Its zipcode is 249875.

Town

Myatlevo had (2015) a population of 1969 people. The town lies at an altitude of 196 metres above sea level.

References

Rural localities in Kaluga Oblast